Naejangsan National Park is located in the provinces of Jeollabuk-do and Jeollanam-do, South Korea. It was designated as the 8th national park in 1971. It is named after the  mountain Naejangsan. The park is home to a total of 919 plant species and 1,880  animal species. 12 of the animals are endangered.

References

External links
The park's page on Korea National Park Service's website

National parks of South Korea
Protected areas established in 1971
Parks in North Jeolla Province
Parks in South Jeolla Province